Princess Suknyeong was a Goryeo Royal Princess as the first and oldest daughter of King Gongyang and Royal Consort Sun. In 1390, she received her royal title along with her sisters, married Wang Jib, a descendant of King Jeonggan. However, both of them were executed after Yi Seong-gye established the new dynasty in 1392.

References

Year of birth unknown
Year of death unknown
Goryeo princesses